Typhlomangelia adenica is a species of sea snail, a marine gastropod mollusk in the family Borsoniidae.

Description
The height of the shell attains 10.2 mm, its width 5.6 mm.

Distribution
This marine species occurs in the Gulf of Aden at a depth between 2000 m and 2300 m.

References

 Sysoev, A.V. (1996b) Deep-sea conoidean gastropods collected by the John Murray Expedition, 1933–34. Bulletin of the Natural History Museum of London, Zoology, 62, 1–30. page(s): 22

adenica
Gastropods described in 1996